Chabad mitzvah campaigns, or Mivtzo'im  refer to the various mitzvah campaigns launched by the Lubavitcher Rebbe, Menachem Mendel Schneerson, for observance by all Jews. During the years 1967 to 1976, Schneerson called all Jews to observe ten basic "beginner's mitzvot"— which, because of their centrality to the Torah's guide to life, are ideally suited for a first experience of the mitzvah connection. In the years that followed there were campaigns for additional mitzvot as well.

Schneerson urged all Jews to reach out to those less affiliated than themselves and encourage them to undertake specific practices of Judaism.

The ten campaigns
Tefillin: Men (age 13 and up) are encouraged to wear the Tefillin every morning excluding Shabbat and Festivals. Started in the year 1967. 
Shabbat Candles: Women and girls (age 3 and up) are encouraged to light candles every Friday afternoon, 18 minutes before sunset, in honor of the Shabbat, and before Festivals.
Mezuzah: Every Jewish home should have a mezuzah on its doorposts. Started in the year 1974. 
Torah Study: Study a portion of Torah daily. Even a few lines contain the infinite wisdom and will of God.
Tzedakah (Charity): Give charity daily will teach you and your children the noble value of regular giving.
Holy Books: Furnish your home with as many holy books as possible. At the very least, a Chumash (Bible), Psalms, and a Prayer Book.
Kosher dietary laws: For a healthy and sound soul, eat only kosher foods, for when you eat differently, your Judaism is not just metaphysical, but part and parcel of your very being. Launched in 1975.
Love Your Fellow: "Love your fellow as yourself," said Rabbi Akiva, is a most basic principle in the Torah. Reaching out to your fellow Jew with patience, love, concern and unity is among the greatest mitzvot a Jew can do.
Education: Every Jewish boy and girl should receive a Jewish education to ensure Jewish integrity, Jewish identity and a Jewish future.
Family Purity: Observance of the Jewish marital laws allows you to make the most of your marriage, bringing you and your spouse to new, undiscovered depths of intimacy and sacredness in your relationship.

Seasonal campaigns
Additionally, Schneerson called for numerous other campaigns. Some were related to the holidays in that time of year:
 the Shofar campaign, that all Jews to hear the Shofar on Rosh Hashanah;
 the Four Species campaign, that all Jews to perform this Mitzvah on Sukkot;
 the Hanukkah campaign, to bring the joy of Hanukah to all Jews, encouraging them to fulfill the Mitzvah of lighting the Menorah. Schneerson announced this campaign in 1973. About 60,000 menorahs were given out that year. Today, roughly 350,000 are distributed around the world in Russian, Hebrew, French, Spanish and English. Each includes a package of Hanukkah candles and a guide for the blessings.
The Hanukkah campaign also includes a campaign to erect and light large Public Menorahs in order to publicize the Hanukkah miracle.
 the Purim campaign, to bring the joy of Purim to all Jews, encouraging them to fulfil the Mitzvos of Purim;
 the campaign encouraging all Jews to use Shmurah Matza for the night of the Passover Seder;
 the Lag Ba'Omer campaign, to bring the joy of Lag Ba'Omer to every Jew, especially by organising Lag Ba'Omer parades for Jewish children;
 the campaign that all Jewish children should hear the ten commandments on Shavuot;
 the campaign for all Jews to study Torah on topics related to the Bet HaMikdash during the Three Weeks of mourning.

Other year round campaigns
Others campaigns applied all year round:
 the campaign for all Jews to study Chasidic philosophy;
 the campaign for all Jews to recite before morning prayer the phrase, "I hereby take upon myself to fulfill the positive [Mitzvah], 'Love your fellow as yourself,'" and after prayer to recite the verse, "Indeed, the righteous will extol Your Name; the upright will dwell in Your presence."
 the campaigns in support of large families;
 the campaign for a Moment of silence in public schools;
 the campaign that every Jew (including and especially children) "purchase" a letter to be inscribed in a Torah scroll;
 the campaign for all Jews to celebrate their Jewish birthdays with a festive gathering, and to undertake to increase in Torah, prayer, and good deeds in the coming year;
 the campaign for all Jews to study Torah on topics related to belief in the Moshiach and the Jewish redemption; and many more.
 the campaign calling on every Jew to reach out to non-Jews to teach and encourage them to adopt the Noahide laws.

History of Mitzvah Campaigns
Schneerson encapsulated his outreach activity in the slogan of "Uforatzto" (Heb. ופרצת) "you shall spread out." The origin of this phrase is in God's words to Ya'akov, "You shall spread out to the west, to the east, to the north, and to the south." Schneerson would  use it in a borrowed sense to refer to the global scale of the outreach activities that he was calling for.

Schneerson's general outreach activity began already in the early years of leadership, but was accelerated with the call for encouraging these specific practices.

Tefillin campaign
The first Mitzvah Campaign was the Tefillin campaign, an international campaign by Chabad Hasidim to influence all male Jews, regardless of their level of religious observance, to fulfill the mitzvah of Tefillin (phylacteries) daily. Schneerson announced this campaign two days before the outbreak of the Six-Day War, on June 3, 1967. After the victory of the Six Day War and the seizure of the Western Wall, Schneerson intensified this call, and his Hasidim gave hundreds of thousands of Jews the opportunity to don tefillin, many for the first time.

The campaign received some opposition at first. Over the course of that summer, some torah observant Jews raised halakhic questions about the propriety of the campaign. In the fall, Schneerson publicly addressed these issues at the farbrengen of parashat bereshit that year, later published in the rabbi's books of Likkutei Sichos. Shortly afterward, the yearly conference of the heads of the World Agudath Israel took place, at which one of the speakers publicly criticized Schneerson and the tefillin campaign. Schneerson responded to this criticism at the farbrengen of parashat toledot that year.

On one occasion Schneerson gave two reasons for his particular choice of campaign, saying, "The first reason is that there is a passage in the Talmudic tractate of Rosh Hashanah which says that once a Jew wears Tefillin on his head—even one time in his life—he falls into a different category as a Jew." Secondly, "When a Jew in Miami sees pictures of Jews at the Western Wall wearing Tefillin, he gets an urge to put on Tefillin himself."

Letter in the Sefer Torah campaign
Schneerson called for Jewish unity by encouraging each Jew to buy a letter in specific Torah scrolls (sefer Torah) and encouraging his followers through the Tzivos Hashem youth group to carry out this campaign. He instructed that all the letters should be purchased prior to the beginning of writing the scroll since he claimed that purchasing a letter in a Torah scroll unites that person with all the other Jews who had purchased letters in the same scroll.
Former Chief Rabbi of Israel Mordechai Eliyahu declared of this campaign, "Only a brilliant mind like our master and teacher, genius and splendor of the generation, the holy Rebbe of Lubavitch, may he live long, can come up with such a grand idea of uniting Jewish children through the writing of letters in a Torah scroll. Indeed, only within Torah, and through Torah, is the true unity of close friendship, love, brotherliness, peace, and companionship possible. We must learn from the Rebbe, and we must do everything in our power to ensure that not a single Jewish child remains without Torah, God forbid."

Torah Study campaign
 the Torah campaign, that all Jews: men, women, and children, engage in regular Torah study. Of this Schneerson said:

Method
Schneerson would refer to these outreach activities as "the ten Mitzvah Campaigns." He emphasised their importance, saying:

Furthermore, he stressed a joyful approach to outreach: 

He also stressed warmth and friendliness: 

He taught that the Jewish education and love your fellow Jew campaigns are all-encompassing campaigns, of which all the other campaigns are a subset.

References

External links
The 10 Point Mitzvah Campaign
Ten Simple Ways to Live Higher
Data and tools to do mivtzoim locally

Chabad outreach
Chabad-Lubavitch (Hasidic dynasty)